The  has its source at Mount Norikura in the northern part of Gifu Prefecture, Japan, and flows into Toyama Prefecture, where it joins with the Jinzū River. It is a Class 1 River.

The river was polluted with cadmium due to mining at the Kamioka mines (神岡鉱山 Kamioka Kōzan) and caused the itai-itai disease outbreak in downstream towns that began shortly before World War II.

River Communities
The river passes through or forms the boundary of the following communities:

Gifu Prefecture
Takayama, Hida
Toyama Prefecture
Toyama

References

External links
 (mouth)

Rivers of Toyama Prefecture
Rivers of Gifu Prefecture
Rivers of Japan